BMC may refer to:

Business and organizations
 Beard Miller Company, a US public accounting firm
 BioMed Central, a UK-based scientific publisher
 BMC Software, an American business service management software vendor
 BMC Switzerland, a Swiss bicycle products manufacturer and sponsor of professional cycling
 Boston Micromachines Corporation, a manufacturer of microelectromechanical deformable mirrors
 Brega Marketing Company, a Libyan company for marketing petroleum and related products
 British Mountaineering Council
 Bulk mail center
 Burma Muslim Congress, a former political party in Myanmar
 Business Model Canvas a canvas diagram invented by Alexander Osterwalder
 Buy Me a Coffee, an American crowdfunding company

Automobiles
 BMC (Turkey), a Turkish manufacturer founded in 1964 as a joint venture with British Motor Corporation (26%) and businessman Ergün Özakat (74%) that was spun-off in 1989
 British Motor Corporation, a defunct British manufacturer founded in 1952 through the merger of Morris Motors and the Austin Motor Company
 British Motor Corporation (Australia), the defunct Australian arm of the British Motor Corporation

Education
 Bangalore Medical College
 Belfast Metropolitan College
 Bengal Music College, a music training college in Kolkata, India
 Bernard Mizeki College, a Zimbabwean high School named after Bernard Mizeki the martyr
 Blue Mountain College, a college in Blue Mountain, Mississippi
 Bolan Medical College
 Brown Mackie College
 Bryn Mawr College, a college in Bryn Mawr, Pennsylvania
 Bangladesh Medical College

Government
 Beltsville Messaging Center, a U.S. Department of State facility
 Bhopal Municipal Corporation, the local urban governing body of the city of Bhopal, Madhya Pradesh, India 
 Bhubaneswar Municipal Corporation, the local urban governing body of the city of Bhubaneswar, Orissa, India 
 Boston Municipal Court, a Boston, Massachusetts, US state court
 Brazilian Marine Corps
 Brigade Modernization Command, for the AETF mission of TRADOC (US Army)
 Brihanmumbai Municipal Corporation, formerly known as the Bombay Municipal Corporation and also known as the Municipal Corporation of Greater Mumbai, the civic body that governs the city of Mumbai, India

Hospitals
 Baystate Medical Center, a hospital in Springfield, MA, US
 Berkshire Medical Center, a hospital in Pittsfield, MA, US
 Boston Medical Center, a hospital in Boston, MA, US

Science and technology
 Bone mineral content, a parameter in bone density testing
 Bulk moulding compound, a thermosetting polymer

Computing
 Baseboard Management Controller, a microcontroller on computer motherboards
 Biphase mark code, a type of encoding for binary data streams
 Bounded Model checking, a technique for verifying formal models

Other uses
 Barrie Molson Centre, an arena in Barrie, Ontario, Canada
 Black middle class
 BMC Racing Team, a professional cycling team
 Bordel militaire de campagne or bordels mobiles de campagne, a mobile brothel for French soldiers
 Botswana Meat Commission FC, a football club in the Botswana Premier League
 Brevard Music Center, a music festival in North Carolina
 British Museum Catalogue
 "BxMxC", a 2020 song by Babymetal
 Chief Boatswain's Mate, a class of Chief Petty Officer in the US Navy and US Coast Guard

See also